Pam Warren may refer to:

 Pam Warren (speaker) (born 1967), British author, activist, and founder of the Paddington Survivor's Group
 Pam Warren (civil servant), American civil servant and former Oklahoma Secretary of Administration
 Pam the Funkstress (1966–2017), American DJ